Bullshot is a 1983 British comedy film, based on the stage play Bullshot Crummond. The name comes from a parody of the 1929 film Bulldog Drummond with the lead character having elements of Drummond and Biggles.

Plot
Captain Hugh "Bullshot" Crummond is a World War I fighter pilot, Olympic athlete, racing driver, and part-time sleuth. He must save the world from the dastardly Count Otto van Bruno, his wartime adversary, and win the heart of the damsel in distress Rosemary Fenton.

Cast
 Alan Shearman as Captain Hugh "Bullshot" Crummond
 Diz White as Rosemary Fenton
 Ronald E. House as Count Otto van Bruno
 Frances Tomelty as Lenya von Bruno
 Michael Aldridge as Professor Rupert Fenton
 Christopher Good as Lord Binky Brancaster
 Ron Pember as Dobbs
 Mel Smith as Crouch
 Billy Connolly as Hawkeye McGillicuddy
 Geoffrey Bayldon as Colonel Hinchcliff

Production
The film was produced by George Harrison's company Handmade Films. Shearman and White reprised their roles from the stage play.

Reception
Colin Greenland reviewed Bullshot for Imagine magazine, and stated that "it is pell-mell, hammer and tongs, hell for leather all the way through a plot that gets more deliciously ludicrous by the second. Superb (over-)acting in spiffing costumes on scrummy sets, not a few guffaws, and comic cameos from Billy Connolly, Mel Smith, John Wells and 'Legs' Larry Smith."

References

External links
 
 

British parody films
1983 films
HandMade Films films
1980s parody films
Films directed by Dick Clement
Films scored by John Du Prez
1983 comedy films
1980s English-language films
1980s British films